The Right Alliance (RA or PA;) is a youth non-governmental organization in Belarus.

At the present time it functions as an organizing committee and aims to get officially registered. The RA stands for conservative, traditional values and supports Belarusian national revival.

Targets
The RA's targets include work, contribution to creating a strong, independent state, defending the rights of Belarus citizens and Belarusians, living abroad, development of national culture, education, promotion of healthy lifestyle and patriotic ideas in the society.

Tasks
 Contributing to securing independence and sovereignty of Republic of Belarus, boosting its international authority;
 Helping state and civil institutions build Belarusian state, based on national, historical traditions;
 Implementation of cultural and educational activity, including studying the history of Belarus, preservation of  mother tongue and traditions of Belarusians;
 Promotion of healthy lifestyle and sport, raising spiritually and physically healthy generation;
 Implementation of  effective youth policy, support of active and talented young people, help in  realization of their socially-useful activity;
 Development and promotion of tourism in Belarus as a means of educating a person, living in harmony with the natural environment;

Among its main targets, the RA names selecting and attracting to organization's activities «devoted sons and daughter of Belarusian people (future elite), ready and able to work for the free, independent and prosperous Republic of Belarus ».

History
The Right Alliance was founded at the beginning of 2004 by former members of  Belarusian Freedom Party (BFP), which got voluntarily dissolved. The RA was founded as an association of Belarusian patriotic youth initiatives.

Today it has several hundred members and representatives in all of the country oblasts (regions).

The organization leader is Juraś Karetnikaŭ.

During its existence The RA has organized and conducted dozens of social and national actions and campaigns: recreation of a memorial sign in honor of Kastuś Kalinoŭski on Kalinoǔski street in Minsk, celebration of the Day of The City in Mahiloŭ, erection of a memorial cross in the village of Dražna, torch procession at the Heroes` Day in Słucak, «Antymak» (Anti-poppy) campaign, aimed at prohibition of sale of opium containing poppy-seeds.

In 2004–2008 the organization was working closely with the right spectrum of Belarusian opposition. It was engaged in organizing security during the first Congress of Democratic Forces (October 2005).

During the presidential elections in 2006 members of The RA, besides spreading informational and canvassing,  were providing security for a joint candidate of the UDF (United Democratic Forces) A. Milinkievič.

During the local elections in 2007 12 members of the RA became candidates for deputy (of which 4 in the capital of the country).
Three members of the organization took part in the elections to the House of Representatives in 2008.
Publications: bulletin «Pachodnia», «Vartaŭnik Dziaržavy» newspaper, «Paŭdniovy Zachad» district newspaper.
The RA cooperates with the movement "For Freedom" (leader A. Milinkievič), the organizing committee of the BCD (Belarusian Christian Democracy), the PBPF (Party of Belarusian Popular Front) and others, as well as right-wing organizations in Ukraine, Lithuania, Poland.

External links
Official website

2004 establishments in Belarus
Conservative parties in Belarus
Political parties established in 2004
Political parties in Belarus